Military Academy is an American drama film directed by D. Ross Lederman, scripted by Karl Brown and David Silverstein from a story by Richard English and released as a low-budget programmer by Columbia Pictures on August 6, 1940.  It is one of numerous military-school or patriotic-adventure-themed, quickly-produced second features for a primarily juvenile audience, which every studio rushed before the cameras following the September 1939 outbreak of war in Europe and, subsequently, the Selective Training and Service Act of 1940, passed by Congress on September 14 and signed by President Franklin Roosevelt on September 16.

Plot 
Tommy Kelly is a fifteen-year-old sent to the Military Academy under an assumed surname.  His father, a well-known crime figure, although now reformed, has made the family name so notorious that his relatives find it difficult to relate to society at large once the truth becomes known.  At the school he makes friends with two other misfits, a cocky champion athlete and an overprotected son of a wealthy family who cannot adjust himself to the strict regimen.  A senior cadet immediately becomes the nemesis of the three younger boys.

Kelly's family name is exposed and he faces ostracism from fellow cadets, except for his two friends who continue to support him.  Ultimately, however, all the boys prove themselves to be fine, upstanding, patriotic young Americans on the eve of World War II.

Cast
 Tommy Kelly as Tommy Lewis
 Bobby Jordan as Dick Hill
 David Holt as Sandy Blake
 Jackie Searl as Prentiss Dover
 Don Beddoe as Marty Lewis
 Jimmy Butler as Cadet Dewey
 Walter Tetley as Cadet Blackburn
 Earle Foxe as Maj. Dover
 Eddie Dew as Capt. Kendall
 Warren Ashe as Capt. Banning
 Joan Leslie as Marjorie Blake (as Joan Brodel)

References

External links

T.S. (Theodore Strauss) "THE SCREEN; At the Globe" (review of Military Academy in the August 5, 1940 edition of The New York Times)
"South of Pago Pago Playing At Padre Theater" (Military Academy and other films opening that week are given brief reviews in the September 21, 1940 edition of San Jose Evening News)

1940 films
1940 drama films
American drama films
Columbia Pictures films
1940s English-language films
American black-and-white films
Films directed by D. Ross Lederman
1940s American films